Wager Bay or Ukkusiksalik Bay is long narrow inlet in the Kivalliq Region of Nunavut, Canada, which opens east into Roes Welcome Sound at the northwest end of Hudson Bay. Ukkusiksalik National Park surrounds it.

History 
Wager Bay was first charted by Christopher Middleton during his Arctic explorations of 1742. He named it after Sir Charles Wager and was trapped in the bay for three weeks until the ice cleared in Roes Welcome Sound. In 1747, William Moor sent boat parties to the head of the bay.

Geography 
The bay is a long inlet stretching through tundra; its shoreline measures  in length. North Lake, South Lake, Brown Lake, and Ford Lake are nearby.

References

Footnotes

Bibliography 
 

Bays of Kivalliq Region
Former populated places in the Kivalliq Region
Hudson's Bay Company trading posts in Nunavut